Apper (originally named KPackageKit) is a free and open source Linux front-end application for the PackageKit package management service by KDE.

Apper also has one main difference compared to the old KPackageKit: Apper can list applications instead of listing only packages. This makes it much more user-friendly and allows the user to search for and install applications without the added complexity of dealing with packages and dependencies. Besides installation of new applications it also allows easy removal and updates. It can be compared to the Ubuntu Software Center as well as the AppStream project.

Apper has been adopted by a few distributions such as Fedora, Debian and openSUSE 12.1.

References

External links
  – Developer’s blog

Applications using D-Bus
Free package management systems
Package management software that uses Qt